RTV 1879 Basel is a Swiss handball team located in Basel. Their home matches are played at the Sportzentrum Rankhof.

Kits

External links
 
 

Swiss handball clubs
Basel

Accomplishments

Swiss Handball League: 
Winners (2) : 1960, 1984